The Noosa River Ferries (also known as Noosa North Shore Ferries) are two cable ferries crossing the Noosa River at Tewantin in Queensland Australia.

Originally installed to service the mineral sand industry operating in the Teewah Beach area. The ferries are now used to provide access to Teewah Beach, Cooloola National Park and the growing suburb of Noosa North Shore located on the northern bank of the Noosa River.

External links

Public transport in Sunshine Coast, Queensland
Ferry transport in Queensland
Cable ferries in Australia